Avoyelles Parish School Board is a school district headquartered in Marksville, Louisiana, United States. The district serves Avoyelles Parish in south central Louisiana.

Former Louisiana State Senate President Donald E. Hines, M.D., was a member of the Avoyelles School Board from 1972 to 1993.

School uniforms
Students are required to wear school uniforms.

Schools

High schools
Zoned
 Avoyelles High School  (Moreauville)
 Bunkie High School  (Bunkie)
 Marksville High School  (Marksville)
Magnet
 Louisiana School for the Agricultural Sciences  (Unincorporated area)

Elementary schools
 Bunkie Elementary School (Bunkie)
 Cottonport Elementary School (Cottonport)
 Lafargue Elementary School (Unincorporated area)
 Marksville Elementary School (Marksville)
 Plaucheville Elementary School (Unincorporated area)
 Riverside Elementary School (Simmesport)

References

External links
 Avoyelles Parish School Board

Education in Avoyelles Parish, Louisiana
School districts in Louisiana